Diisopropyl azodicarboxylate (DIAD) is the diisopropyl ester of azodicarboxylic acid. It is used as a reagent in the production of many organic compounds. It is often used in the Mitsunobu reaction, where it serves as an oxidizer of triphenylphosphine to triphenylphosphine oxide. It has also been used to generate aza-Baylis-Hillman adducts with acrylates. It can also serve as a selective deprotectant of N-benzyl groups in the presence of other protecting groups.

It is sometimes preferred to diethyl azodicarboxylate (DEAD) because it is more hindered, and thus less likely to form hydrazide byproducts.

One notable use of this compound is in the synthesis of Bifenazate (Floramite®).

References

Azo compounds
Carboxylate esters
Isopropyl esters